Šimůnek (feminine Šimůnková) is a Czech surname. Notable people include:

 František Šimůnek, Czech Nordic skier
 Jan Šimůnek, Czech footballer
 Jaromír Šimůnek, Czech biathlete
 Karel Šimůnek, Czech watercolorist and illustrator
 Ladislav Šimůnek, Czech footballer
 Radomír Šimůnek, Jr., Czech cyclist
 Radomír Šimůnek, Sr., Czech cyclist
 Vladimír Šimůnek, Czech cross-country skier

Czech-language surnames